Iskateley is an urban locality (a work settlement) and the administrative center of Zapolyarny District of Nenets Autonomous Okrug, Russia. It is located on the right bank of the Pechora River,  from the center of the city of Naryan-Mar. Population:

History
The settlement developed around the geology exploration point founded here in 1968. The name "Iskateley", which means "Explorers", was given to the settlement in 1974, and in 1986 it was granted an urban-type settlement (work settlement) status. Until 2005 Iskateley was administratively subordinated to the city of Naryan-Mar. In 2008 it became the administrative center of Zapolyarny District.

Administrative and municipal status
Within the framework of administrative divisions, Iskateley is incorporated as an urban-type settlement within Zapolyarny District. As a municipal division, Work Settlement Iskateley is incorporated within Zapolyarny Municipal District.

Economy

Industry
Several companies dealing with oil exploration are based in the settlement.

Transportation
Iskateley is connected with Naryan-Mar by an urban bus line. The airport, as well as the river port, are located in Naryan-Mar.

References

Notes

Sources

Urban-type settlements in Nenets Autonomous Okrug